James Elmer Duggan (June 1, 1885 – December 5, 1951) was an American professional baseball player. Except for one game with St. Louis Browns in 1911, first baseman Duggan spent his entire 11-year professional career in the minor leagues.

Early life and career 
Duggan born on Monday, June 1, 1885, in Whiteland, Indiana. He graduated from Whiteland High School and attended Franklin College before entering pro ball with the Atlanta Crackers of the Southern Association in 1906. He was playing for the Holyoke, Massachusetts Papermakers (Connecticut League) in 1911 when the franchise folded on June 20. A few days later, the Browns summoned him to Detroit for a game with the Tigers. Batting seventh, Duggan went hitless in four at bats, drew a walk, drove in a run and scored once in a 6-5 St. Louis victory. It would be his only major league appearance.

After the majors 
Duggan's last six professional seasons were spent in the Three-I League. Starting in 1912, he spent four years in Decatur, Illinois, and in 1915 he was the Commodores' playing manager. He split the 1916 season between the Rock Island Islanders. and Davenport Blue Sox. He finished his career in 1917 as a player-manager with the Blues of Alton, Illinois.

In 1918 Duggan entered the army, He was on board a ship bound for Europe when World War I ended.

Johnny Duggan, Jim's brother, was a minor league outfielder.

External links

Major League Baseball first basemen
St. Louis Browns players
Nashville Vols players
Atlanta Crackers players
New Haven Blues players
Holyoke Papermakers players
Decatur Commodores players
Rock Island Islanders players
Davenport Blue Sox players
Baseball players from Indiana
1885 births
1951 deaths
People from Johnson County, Indiana
Alton Blues players